Morlunda is an unincorporated community in Greenbrier County, West Virginia, United States.

Its name was taken from the small town of Mörlunda in the southern Swedish province of Småland. It means "wooded marsh"

References

Unincorporated communities in Greenbrier County, West Virginia
Unincorporated communities in West Virginia